Sur Kshetra is a 2012 singing talent show or musical battle between teams of two neighboring countries: Pakistan and India. The show is hosted by Indian actress Ayesha Takia. The Pakistani Team is led by singer, music director, music composer, actor Atif Aslam and the Indian Team is led by music director Himesh Reshammiya.

It has been shown on Colors TV and Sahara One in India, Geo TV and Aag TV in Pakistan. The show has been produced by Saaibaba Telefilms and Directed by Gajendra Singh, having Santosh Shendye as the production head . The creative Director of the show is Kshonish Palit and Associate Creative Director is Mohammad Faizan.

The show concluded with a finalist face off between the two teams, in which Nabeel Shaukat Ali from Pakistan won the title.

Format 
The contestants are judged by the jury members based on their performance and are awarded marks which is either a zero or a ten. Meaning that if the jury likes the performance they will give a 10 otherwise a 0. The marks of individual contestants are then added team wise and the team with the higher score wins and the captain of the winning team gets to choose a participant to compete for the finalist chairs in a face off. After four episodes the face off takes place and the winner of the face off gets a finalist chair which means straight entry to the finals, while the losing captain has to eliminate one of its contestants.

Finalists 
There were 5 finalist chairs at the start of the show. Sara Raza Khan was the first contestant to sit on a finalist chair based on the decision of the jury. Mulazzim Hussain became the second finalist after winning the face off. Yashraj Kapil sat on the third finalist chair as the captain Himesh Reshammiya left it up to the judges to decide the third finalist from his team. Budhaditya Mukherjee became the fourth finalist after winning the face off for the fourth chair. The battle for the fifth chair proved to be the most exciting as Nabeel Shaukat Ali from Pakistan and Diljaan from team India went head to head in the face off. There was a lot of drama after the face off as both the contestants sang really well and it became very tough for the jury members to decide who should be the fifth finalist Asha Bhosle wanted Diljaan to be the finalist while Abida Parveen wanted Nabeel Shaukat Ali to be the fifth finalist. The neutral judge Runa Laila refused to take the decision and threatened to walk out of the show. After much drama it was finally decided that there would be six finalists instead of five and hence both Diljaan and Nabeel Shaukat Ali made it to the finals.
And in the finales Nabeel Shaukat Ali from Pakistan won the title by beating Diljaan in the face-off round.

Eliminations 

Shahzad Ali from team India was the first to be eliminated. Anurag Srivastava & Indrani Bhattacherjee also from team India was the next to go. Ameer Ali from team Pakistan became the third eliminated contestant and Imran Ali was eliminated next. As Diljaan and Nabeel Shaukat Ali were chosen as the contestants to face off for the fifth finalist chair, Aman Trikha and Nadeem Abbas were eliminated.

Finally there were six finalists on the bench. Three from Pakistan and Three from India. In the Pre-finals it was announced that two finalists with minimum marks would be eliminated and remaining four participants would go through to the Grand Finals. Sara Raza Khan was unable to compete in the last two pre-finals because of her health so she along with Buddhaditya was eliminated as they had the lowest marks.

Jury members 

  Abida Parveen
  Asha Bhonsle
  Runa Laila

Guest Jury members 
  Ghulam Ali
  Sajjad Ali
  Hadiqa Kiani
  Ismail Darbar
  Suresh Wadkar
  Alka Yagnik

Team Pakistan 
Captain: Atif AslamCoach: Rustam Fateh Ali Khan

Members 
 Nabeel Shaukat Ali <Winner>
 Mulazim Hussain
 Imran Ali Akhtar
 Nadeem Abbas
 Ameer Ali
 Sara Raza Khan  left the show in pre-finals due to health issues

Team India 
Captain: Himesh ReshammiyaCoach: Himesh Reshammiya

Members 

 Diljaan <Runner Up>
 Yashraj Kapil
 Anurag Srivastava
 Budhaditya Mukherjee
 Shahzad Ali
 Indrani Bhattacharjee
 Aman Trikha

References

External links 
 Colors
 Sahara One Website
 Aag TV

India–Pakistan relations in popular culture
Indian reality television series
Pakistani music television series
Singing talent shows
2012 Indian television series debuts
2012 Indian television series endings
Atif Aslam
2012 Pakistani television series debuts
2012 Pakistani television series endings
Colors TV original programming
Geo TV original programming
Sahara One original programming
Colors Rishtey original programming